Krugiodendron ferreum, commonly known as the black ironwood or leadwood, is a species of tree in the family Rhamnaceae. It is found in southern Florida, throughout the Caribbean and from southern Mexico to Honduras.  Originally described by Martin Vahl, its specific epithet is the Latin adjective ferreus ("iron-like").

Taxonomy
It is the only species in the genus Krugiodendron. The genus name honors Leopold Krug (1833–1898). The common names for this species refer to its dense wood.

Description
Typical air-dry samples have densities of approximately 1.30 g/cm3, and up to 1.42 g/cm3. The tree reaches  in height with oppositely arranged, emarginate leaves and small greenish flowers.  The fruit is a drupe 5 to 7 mm long turning purplish red as it matures.

It is widely cultivated in gardens or parks as a drought-tolerant specimen tree.

References

External links
Image of bark
Foliage
Wood
Fruit and flowers

Rhamnaceae
Rhamnaceae genera
Monotypic Rosales genera
Flora of Florida
Trees of Mexico
Trees of South America
Garden plants of North America
Ornamental trees
Drought-tolerant trees